Tablas Strait, also Tabuas Strait, is a strait in the Philippines separating Mindoro Island from Panay and Romblon islands.

The strait is known for being the place where the Sulpicio Lines-owned passenger ferry MV Doña Paz and oil tanker MT Vector sank on December 20, 1987, after colliding with each other, resulting in more than 4,386 deaths. It was the deadliest peacetime maritime disaster in history.

Straits of the Philippines
Landforms of Romblon
Landforms of Oriental Mindoro
Landforms of Antique (province)
Landforms of Aklan